Fernando Pereira de Freitas (18 July 1934 – 10 February 2006), also commonly known as Fernando Brobró was a Brazilian basketball player. He competed in the men's tournament at the 1960 Summer Olympics.

References

External links
 

1934 births
2006 deaths
Brazilian men's basketball players
1959 FIBA World Championship players
Olympic basketball players of Brazil
Basketball players at the 1960 Summer Olympics
Basketball players from Rio de Janeiro (city)
Olympic bronze medalists for Brazil
Olympic medalists in basketball
Medalists at the 1960 Summer Olympics
CR Vasco da Gama basketball players
Flamengo basketball players